Capsized is a science fiction-themed platform game with run and gun mechanics.  It was developed by Alientrap. Capsized was released for Microsoft Windows on April 29, 2011 on Steam. The iOS version, called Capsized+, was available February 13, 2013, and published by IndiePub. The soundtrack is provided by Solar Fields; the ambient electronic music is from his 2009 album Movements.

Reception
The Microsoft Windows version of Capsized has received generally favorable reviews since its release, with an average rating of 80 out of 100 at Metacritic, based on 19 critic reviews.

References

External links

2011 video games
Indie video games
IOS games
Linux games
Metroidvania games
MacOS games
Microsoft XNA games
Platform games
Science fiction video games
Video games developed in Canada
Xbox 360 Live Arcade games
Windows games
Multiplayer and single-player video games